2BH is an Australian radio station owned by the Super Radio Network.  The station serves Broken Hill, New South Wales and parts of the Far West region.

The station has been broadcasting on the AM band for over 80 years, its first transmission being in July 1934. The current format is "News, Sport and Talk", but they also play Gold music from the 60s, 70s and 80s and Australian Country music.

Its iconic building (shown) is shaped as an old radio and is a tourist attraction on Broken Hill; some tour buses and companies include it in their tours.

Upstairs in the station is a "Museum" of different radios and transmitters, tape reels and speakers. These range from the 1940s Gulbransen Super-Heterodyne to the 1948 Kriesler Radio through to old radio broadcasting equipment. Most of the equipment on display is Australian made. Unfortunately almost all of this equipment is thought to be out of order.

2BH 567AM has a local program for 3 hours a day, from 5:30am CST to 8:30am CST with the "Bigger Brighter Brekkie Show".

References

External links
Official web site
Official web site

Radio stations in New South Wales
Radio stations established in 1934
News and talk radio stations in Australia
Classic hits radio stations in Australia
Broadcast Operations Group
1934 establishments in Australia